Kang Ki-doong (born March 25, 1987) is a South Korean actor.

Filmography

Film

Television series

Web series

Drama special

Theater

Awards and nominations

References

External links 
 
 

Living people
1987 births
21st-century South Korean male actors
Korea National University of Arts alumni